Throughout the history of Major League Baseball (MLB), franchises have had various postseason and World Series droughts.

All 16 of the original Major League franchises (i.e., those in place when the first World Series was played in 1903) have won the World Series, with the longest wait for a franchise's first championship being for the Phillies ( seasons, ending in 1980). Since expansion began in 1961, six of the 14 expansion teams have never won the World Series. Furthermore, one franchise, the Cleveland Guardians, currently has a championship drought that pre-dates the expansion era. The three longest championship droughts in history were ended recently by the Red Sox ( seasons, ending in 2004), the White Sox ( seasons, ending in 2005), and the Cubs ( seasons, ending in 2016).

Only one expansion franchise (the Seattle Mariners) has never won a pennant (i.e., the league championship, the two winners of which meet in the World Series). The three longest pennant droughts in history were recently ended by the Nationals ( years, starting with the team's foundation and ending in 2019, and including the franchise's entire  years as the Montreal Expos), the Rangers ( years, starting with the team's foundation and ending in 2010) and the Cubs ( years, ending in 2016).  As the Nationals are the third franchise to be based in the city of Washington, their 2019 pennant also ended a drought of   seasons played in Washington since their last pennant, which was in 1933 (here we discount the 33 seasons during which there was no team in Washington).

As of the 2021 season, every active MLB franchise has qualified for the playoffs, especially since expansion of the playoffs in 1994 made that feat easier. The Tigers and the Angels are tied with the longest active postseason drought at 8 years. Long postseason droughts were ended recently by the Nationals ( years for the franchise,  seasons over  years for the city, ending in 2012), the Pirates ( years, ending in 2013), the Royals ( years, ending in 2014),  the Blue Jays ( years, ending in 2015), the Mariners ( years, ending in 2022), and the Phillies ( years, ending in 2022).

This list includes only the modern World Series between the American League (AL) and the National League (NL), not the various 19th-century championship series. Those teams which have never achieved a particular accomplishment in their franchise history are listed by the date they entered the leagues.

World Series championship droughts

Longest current World Series championship droughts
No World Series was played in 1994, and counts as a drought season for those franchises.

Longest World Series championship droughts through history

The first World Series was played in 1903.  No World Series was played in 1904 or 1994. This list only shows droughts of 30 or more seasons.  Active droughts are listed in bold type.

World Series championship droughts by city/region
This list only includes cities/regions with current Major League Baseball franchises.
Years during which a city/region did not field a Major League Baseball team are not counted.

*city without Major League Baseball franchise for 4 seasons (1966–1969)

†city without Major League Baseball franchise for 7 seasons (1970–1976)

‡number does not indicate a title won, but rather total seasons played.

World Series in which neither team had previously won a championship

In these instances, the World Series matchup ensured that one team would win the first championship in its history.

*In these cases, each team was making its first World Series appearance.

World Series in which neither team had previously lost a championship

In these instances, the World Series matchup ensured that one team would lose the first championship in its history.

*In these cases, each team was making its first World Series appearance.

World Series in which both teams had ended pennant droughts of 20-plus seasons

World Series in which neither franchise had won a championship in 30-plus seasons

Teams that had never won the World Series are included, even if they were less than 30 seasons old at the time. Bold denotes team that won.

Numbers marked with * indicates that the number is counted from either the franchise's first year of existence or the first year of the modern World Series (1903).

World Series Championship droughts by division

World Series appearance droughts

Longest current World Series appearance droughts
No World Series was played in 1994 due to the players' strike that year.

Longest Major League pennant droughts through history
List begins with 1903, about the time the current configuration of National League and American League stabilized and also the year of the first World Series. No pennants were won in 1994 due to the players strike that year. This list only shows droughts of 20 or more seasons.  Active droughts are listed in bold type.

Major League pennant droughts by city/region
This list only includes cities/regions with current Major League Baseball franchises.
Years during which a city/region did not field a Major League Baseball team are not counted.

*city without Major League Baseball franchise for 7 seasons (1970–1976)

†number does not indicate a title won, but rather total seasons played.

League championship appearance droughts

Longest current league championship appearance droughts
No league championships were played in 1994 due to the players' strike that year.

League division champion droughts

Longest current division champion droughts
No league division champions were won in 1994 due to the players' strike that year.

* Because of the wild card postseason berth, the franchise have won two World Series championships (1997, 2003) without winning the division.
** Also the franchise without a winning record for 20 consecutive seasons (1993–2012).

Longest division championship droughts through history
List begins with 1969, the time divisional play started in Major League Baseball. This list only shows droughts of 10 or more seasons.  Active droughts are listed in bold type.

Postseason droughts

Longest current postseason droughts

Longest postseason droughts in the expanded-postseason era
After the postseason was expanded in 1995 to include eight teams (further expanded in 2012 to ten teams and again expanded in 2022 to 12 teams), 18 of the 30 teams qualified within the first five years, and few teams went for long droughts without at least participating in the first round of the postseason. This list only shows droughts of 15 or more seasons that occurred primarily in the expanded-postseason era.  Active droughts are listed in bold type.

See also

 List of Major League Baseball franchise postseason streaks
 List of Major League Baseball postseason series
 List of Major League Baseball postseason teams
 List of all-time Major League Baseball win–loss records
 List of NBA franchise post-season droughts
 List of NFL franchise post-season droughts
 List of NHL franchise post-season droughts
 List of MLS club post-season droughts

References

Major League Baseball postseason
Major League Baseball records
MLB, postseason droughts